The 2002 Montana State Bobcats football team was an American football team that represented Montana State University in the Big Sky Conference (Big Sky) during the 2002 NCAA Division I-AA football season. Montana State lost to McNeese State in the first round of the NCAA Division I-AA Football Championship playoffs and ranked No. 19 in the final I-AA poll by The Sports Network.

Schedule

References

Montana State
Montana State Bobcats football seasons
Big Sky Conference football champion seasons
Montana State Bobcats football